Richard Edwards (born April 15, 1983) is a Jamaican former footballer and serves on the technical staff for Brampton Soccer Club.

Playing career 
Edwards began his career in 2004 with Waterhouse F.C. in the National Premier League. In 2006, he signed with Harbour View F.C., and won the league title in 2007, 2010, and the 2007 CFU Club Championship. In 2012, he went overseas to Finland to sign with Mikkelin Palloilijat in the Kakkonen. At the conclusion of the season he returned home to sign with Harbour View.

In 2013, he went abroad to Canada to sign with the York Region Shooters of the Canadian Soccer League. During his tenure with York Region he won the CSL Championship in 2014, 2017, along with the league title in 2014, and 2016. In 2018, he played in League1 Ontario for Unionville Milliken SC, and with Master's Futbol in 2019.

International career 
Edwards played with the Jamaica national football team, where he featured in 36 matches.

Managerial career 
In 2018, he formed his own training school for soccer known as Touch of Class Soccer. On May 26, 2020, Brampton Soccer Club named him to the technical staff for the under-12, 13, and 15 women's soccer program.

Honours

Jamaica
Caribbean Cup: 2010

Harbour View F.C.
Jamaica National Premier League: 2007, 2010, 2013
CFU Club Championship:  2007

York Region Shooters
Canadian Soccer League First Division: 2014, 2016
CSL Championship: 2014, 2017

References 

1983 births
Living people
Jamaican footballers
2011 CONCACAF Gold Cup players
Waterhouse F.C. players
Harbour View F.C. players
Mikkelin Palloilijat players
York Region Shooters players
Canadian Soccer League (1998–present) players
National Premier League players
Association football midfielders
Jamaica international footballers
Master's FA players
Unionville Milliken SC players